4-Aminobutyrate aminotransferase is a protein that in humans is encoded by the ABAT gene. This gene is located in chromosome 16 at position of 13.2. This gene goes by a number of names, including, GABA transaminase, GABAT, 4-aminobutyrate transaminase, NPD009 etc. This gene is mainly and abundant located in neuronal tissues. 4-Aminobutyrate aminotransferase belongs to group of pyridoxal 5-phosphate-dependent enzyme which activates a large portion giving reaction to amino acids. ABAT is made up of two monomers of enzymes where each subunit has a molecular weight of 50kDa. It is identified that almost tierce of human synapses have GABA. GABA is a neurotransmitter that has different roles in different regions of the central and peripheral nervous systems. It can be found also in some tissues that do not have neurons. In addition, GAD and GABA-AT are responsible in regulating the concentration of GABA.

Characteristic 
GABA's feature is that it does not fluorescent nor electroactive which is why it is hard to determine the reaction of enzymes because no peroxidase and dehydrogenase was identified. One characteristic of GABA is having low lipophilic which results in the difficulty to cross the blood brain barrier. A lot of researchers have been trying to discover molecules that have a property of high lipophilicity. The quantification of GABA concentration during cell activity needs to have high spatial and temporal resolution. As before, high performance liquid chromatography (HPLC) was used in quantifying GABA concentration levels. In present time, GABA is now analyze, measured in small volume with a short period of time with the use of electrochemiluminescence. GABA acts as a tropic factor which then affects some cell activity such as rapid cell reproduction, cell death and differentiation. Intracellular communication is also one of the many functions of GABA outside the nervous system.

Function 

4-Aminobutyrate aminotransferase (ABAT) is responsible for catabolism of gamma-aminobutyric acid (GABA), an important, mostly inhibitory neurotransmitter in the central nervous system, into succinic semialdehyde. The active enzyme is a homodimer of 50-kD subunits complexed to pyridoxal-5-phosphate. The protein sequence is over 95% similar to the pig protein. ABAT in liver and brain is controlled by 2 codominant alleles with a frequency in a Caucasian population of 0.56 and 0.44. GABA acts as a tropic factor which then affects some cell activity such as rapid cell reproduction, cell death and differentiation. Intracellular communication is also one of the many functions of GABA outside the nervous system. GABA-transaminaze enzyme production was made of ABAT gene command. The main function of ABAT acts as inhibition (neurotransmitter), where it prevents overloading activity of the brain from large amount of signals.

ABAT activates the beginning of deterioration of GABA. Likewise, suppression of ABAT results in depletion of transient lower esophageal sphincter relaxation (TLESR) and acid reflux activity. Treating of GERD is possible means of suppressing ABAT's physiology.

ABAT Deficiency 
ABAT defect is uncommon disorder. The signs and symptoms of this deficiency were observed from a Dutch family, two of the siblings, and a 6-month pediatric Japanese. These patients have same signs and symptoms that were observed. This include low muscle tone or known as floppy baby syndrome, over responsive reflexes and developmental delay. The ABAT deficiency phenotype includes psychomotor retardation, hypotonia, hyperreflexia, lethargy, refractory seizures, and EEG abnormalities. Multiple alternatively spliced transcript variants encoding the same protein isoform have been found for this gene. Abnormal GABA-transaminaze enzyme results in encephalopathy which is observed in pediatric patients and this deficiency have life expectancy of less than 2 years and some survived more than the given life expectancy. Abnormal protein that is being set free from uncontrolled amount of GABA will affect the growth of individual (growth hormone).

Decrease level of GABA concentration results in convulsion.

Medicine 
Vigabatrin is a drug that is irreparably suppresses GABA transaminase that causes increased amount of GABA in the brain.

Discovery 
In a recent study, it was found out that the increase amount of GABA will stop the consequences of drug addiction. The suppression of ABAT which causing the amount of GABA to increase has a connection to children with those suffer from movement disability. This gene is also link as one genetic cause of GERD.

ABAT has been proved that it is important in mitochondrial nucleoside.

References

External links

Further reading